The Boxer's Bride is a 1926 German silent sports film directed by Johannes Guter and starring Xenia Desni, Willy Fritsch and Hermann Picha.

The film's sets were designed by the art director Erich Czerwonski.

Cast

References

Bibliography

External links

1926 films
1920s sports films
German sports films
Films of the Weimar Republic
German silent feature films
Films directed by Johannes Guter
UFA GmbH films
German black-and-white films
Films produced by Erich Pommer
1920s German films
1920s German-language films
Silent sports films